Union Sportive de Sinnamary is a French Guianese football club playing at the top level. It is based in Sinnamary.  Their home stadium is Stade Omnisports.

Achievements
 French Guiana Championnat National: 3
 1992–93, 1993–94, 1996–97

 Coupe D.O.M.: 1
 1993

 Coupe de Guyane: 3
 1995–96, 1997–98, 2001–02

 Coupe de la Municipalité de Kourou: 1
 1983–84

Performance in CONCACAF competitions
 CONCACAF Champions' Cup: 2 appearances
1994 – Second Round (Caribbean) – Lost to Club Franciscain 5–2 on aggregate (stage 3 of 5)
1996 – First Round (Caribbean) – Withdrew against Prekesh (stage 1 of 4)

The club in the French football structure
 Coupe de France: 1 appearance
1994–95

References

Football clubs in French Guiana